Leloaloa is a village on Tutuila Island, American Samoa. It is located in Maoputasi County. As of the 2010 U.S. census, the village had a population of 448. It is the birthplace of former United States Representative Tulsi Gabbard.

Demographics

References

Villages in American Samoa
Tutuila